Robert Zoller (born April 8, 1961) is a retired Austrian alpine skier.

He was born in Mühlbach am Hochkönig.

World Cup victories

External links
 
 

1961 births
Living people
Austrian male alpine skiers
People from St. Johann im Pongau District